The Tressa is a torrent in Tuscany, central Italy, a tributary of the river Arbia. It's 17 kilometer long and its source is located near Marciano, in the comune of Siena. It flows across the territory of Monteroni d'Arbia and then into the river Arbia near Ponte a Tressa.

Rivers of the Province of Siena
Rivers of Italy